Hoeft or Höft is a surname. Notable people with the surname include:

Billy Hoeft (1932–2010), American baseball player
Carl Hoeft (born 1974), New Zealand rugby union footballer
Rainer Höft (born 1956), East German handball player

See also
Hoeft & Wessel AG, a German software company
Hoeft State Park a park in Michigan, United States